Operation Tannenberg was a codename for one of the anti-Polish extermination actions by Nazi Germany that were directed at the Poles during the opening stages of World War II in Europe, as part of the Generalplan Ost for the German colonization of the East. The shootings were conducted with the use of a proscription list (Sonderfahndungsbuch Polen), compiled by the Gestapo in the span of two years before the 1939 invasion.

The top secret lists identified more than 61,000 members of the Polish elite: activists, intelligentsia, scholars, clergy, actors, former officers and others, who were to be interned or shot. Members of the German minority living in Poland assisted in preparing the lists.  that up to 20,000 Germans living in Poland belonged to organizations involved in various forms of subversion.

Operation Tannenberg was followed by the Intelligenzaktion, a second phase of the Unternehmen Tannenberg directed by Heydrich's Sonderreferat from Berlin, which lasted until January 1940. In Pomerania alone, 36,000–42,000 Poles, including children, were killed before the end of 1939.

Implementation

The plan was finalized in May 1939 by the Central Office II P (Poland). Following the orders of Adolf Hitler, a special unit dubbed Tannenberg was created within the Reich Security Main Office (Reichssicherheitshauptamt). It commanded a number of Einsatzgruppen units formed with Gestapo, Kripo and Sicherheitsdienst (SD) officers and men who were theoretically to follow the Wehrmacht (armed forces) into occupied territories. Their task was to track down and arrest all the people listed on the proscription lists exactly as it had been compiled before the outbreak of war.

The first phase of the action occurred in August 1939 when about 2,000 activists of Polish minority organisations in Germany were arrested and murdered. The second phase of the action began on September 1, 1939, and ended in October, resulting in at least 20,000 deaths in 760 mass executions by Einsatzgruppen special task units with help from regular Wehrmacht units. A special formation was created from the German minority living in Poland called Selbstschutz, whose members had trained in Germany before the war in diversion and guerilla fighting (see: Deutscher Volksverband, the German People's Union in Poland). The formation was responsible for many massacres and due to its bad reputation was dissolved by Nazi authorities after the September Campaign with transfer to regular formations.

Massacres of hospital patients

During Operation Tannenberg patients from Polish hospitals were murdered in Wartheland (Wielkopolska) by Einsatzgruppe VI men led by Herbert Lange, who was under the command of Erich Naumann. He was appointed commandant of the first Chełmno extermination camp soon thereafter. By mid-1940, Lange and his men were responsible for the murder of about 1100 patients in Owińska, 2750 patients at Kościan, 1558 patients and 300 Poles at Działdowo who were shot in the back of the neck; and hundreds of Poles at Fort VII where the mobile gas-chamber (Einsatzwagen) was first developed along with the first gassing bunker.

According to the historian Peter Longerich, the hospital massacres were conducted on the initiative of Einsatzgruppen, because they were not ordered by Himmler. Lange's experience in the mass killing of Poles during Operation Tannenberg was the reason why Ernst Damzog, the Commander of Sicherheitspolizei (Security Police) and SD stationed in occupied Poznań (Posen) placed him in charge of the SS-Sonderkommando Lange (special detachment) for the purpose of mass gassing operations which led to the eventual annihilation of the Łódź Ghetto.

See also
 Nazi crimes against the Polish nation
 Intelligenzaktion
 Special Prosecution Book-Poland
 Intelligenzaktion Pommern
 Valley of Death
 Katyn massacre
 Gestapo–NKVD conferences (1939–1940)
 Pacification operations in German-occupied Poland
 Operation Himmler
 Anti-Polonism
 History of Poland (1939–1945)
 Genocide
 Wawelberg Group

Notes and references

Bibliography
 Verbatim transcript of Part I of the book  The German New Order in Poland published for the Polish Ministry of Information by Hutchinson & Co., London, in late 1941. The period covered by the book is September, 1939 to June, 1941.
 
 Alfred  Spiess, Heiner Lichtenstein: Unternehmen Tannenberg. Der Anlass zum Zweiten Weltkrieg.  Korrigierte und erweiterte Ausgabe. (Ullstein-Buch ; Nr. 33118 : Zeitgeschichte) Ullstein, Frankfurt/M ; Berlin 1989, .

External links
 
 Jean Maridor, La Station de Radiodiffusion de Gleiwitz (Gliwice) - L'Opération TANNENBERG.  

1939 in Germany
1939 in Poland
Einsatzgruppen
Massacres in Poland
Germany–Poland relations
Invasion of Poland
Nazi war crimes in Poland
Mass murder in 1939
Mass murder in 1940
Persecution by Nazi Germany
Persecution of Poles
Persecution of Jews
Persecution of intellectuals